NBPA can refer to:
National Basketball Players Association
National Black Police Association (UK)
National Black Police Association (United States)